Dąbrówka Mała  is a village in the administrative district of Gmina Węgorzewo, within Węgorzewo County, Warmian-Masurian Voivodeship, in northern Poland, close to the border with the Kaliningrad Oblast of Russia. It is located in the historic region of Masuria.

The village has a population of 180.

The village was founded in 1553.

References

Villages in Węgorzewo County
1553 establishments in Poland
Populated places established in 1553